The Ivorian ambassador in Washington, D.C. is the official representative of the Government in Abidjan to the Government of the United States.

List of representatives

See also
Ivory Coast–United States relations

References 

 
United States
Ivory Coast